The 2021 ARCA Menards Series East was the 35th season of the ARCA Menards Series East, a regional stock car racing series sanctioned by NASCAR in the United States. The season began on February 8 at New Smyrna Speedway with the Jeep Beach 175 and ended on September 16 at Bristol Motor Speedway with the Bush's Beans 200. Sammy Smith and Joe Gibbs Racing won the series championship. JGR's No. 18 car, driven by Smith and Ty Gibbs, won all but one race during the season.

2019 and 2020 series champion Sam Mayer did not go for a three-peat, as he moved up to the Xfinity Series in 2021, driving for JR Motorsports after his 18th birthday on June 26.

Teams and drivers
Note: If a driver is listed as their own crew chief for a particular race, that means that their entry in that race was a start and park.

Complete schedule

Limited schedule

Notes

Changes

Teams
 On November 13, 2020, it was announced that Lira Motorsports would be fielding a part-time entry for late model and NASCAR Roots driver Logan Misuraca. She and the team also announced that they would run part-time in the Truck Series and the big ARCA Menards Series in 2021. Her East Series schedule was going to begin at the season-opener at New Smyrna, however, Misuraca and the team ended up not attempting that race and any other races during the season. Misuraca revealed in an interview in April that her deal with Lira had fallen through.
 On January 19, 2021, Visconti Motorsports announced that Mason Diaz would drive full-time in their No. 74. In 2020, Diaz drove full-time for Venturini Motorsports, which did not field any East Series cars full-time in 2021.
 On May 14, 2021, it was announced that former JR Motorsports late model racing driver Adam Lemke would make his stock car debut in 2021, competing in select main ARCA Series, East Series, and West Series races for Rette Jones Racing. Lemke ended up only running 1 main ARCA Series race for Rette Jones and no East and West Series races. Because Max Gutiérrez drove full-time in the East Series for RJR in the No. 30, Lemke would have driven a second car for the team if he made any East Series starts.

Drivers
 On September 15, 2020, it was announced that two-time consecutive champion Sam Mayer, who drove the No. 21 car for GMS Racing, would move up to the Xfinity Series in June 2021 after he turns 18 and is eligible to race in the series. He will drive the JR Motorsports No. 8 car in the second half of the season. On November 2, 2020, GMS announced that Mayer's replacement in the No. 21 would be Jack Wood, who will drive for them full-time in the East Series as well as all of the ARCA Menards Series Showdown races. Wood previously drove part-time in the ARCA Menards Series West, fielding his own team, Velocity Racing. The team ended up changing those plans, as Wood instead began driving in the main ARCA Menards Series full-time instead of the East Series, and those plans would later fall through as well because in May, Wood was promoted to drive team's No. 24 in the Truck Series. On May 1, it was announced that Conner Jones would make his East Series debut in the GMS No. 21 at the Nashville Fairgrounds.
 On December 18, 2020, DGR-Crosley announced that Joey Iest would join the team to drive in six or more races for the team in the East Series, in addition to continuing to drive for Naake-Klauer Motorsports in the West Series. Iest ended up running the full season for the renamed David Gilliland Racing team in their No. 54 car.
 On January 8, 2021, ThePitLane revealed that Nick Sanchez would continue to compete full-time for Rev Racing in 2021, but would move from the East Series to the main ARCA Menards Series. The official announcement of this came on January 15. Rookie driver Rajah Caruth, who started his career on iRacing and then began racing real cars in 2019 and 2020 with Rev Racing in the NASCAR Advance Auto Parts Weekly Series, would replace Sanchez in the No. 6.
 On February 3, 2021, it was announced that Kyle Busch Motorsports late model racing driver Sammy Smith would move up to the East Series in 2021 and would run the first six races of the series (all of the non-combination races) in the No. 18 for Joe Gibbs Racing, replacing Ty Gibbs, who moved over to the main ARCA Series full-time in 2021 after turning 18. When Ty Gibbs returned to the East Series to compete in the race at Dover, JGR put him in the No. 18 and fielded a second car for Smith, the No. 81. Smith ended up running the full season for JGR as he also drove the No. 81 in the three combination races.
 On February 5, 2021, Rette Jones Racing announced that NASCAR Mexico Series driver Max Gutiérrez would drive their No. 30 full-time in the East Series in 2021. He made his ARCA debut in 2020, running the races at Bristol and Five Flags in the No. 53 for Troy Williams Racing.
 CARS Tour driver Carson Kvapil, the son of former NASCAR driver Travis Kvapil, made his ARCA debut in the East Series season-opener at New Smyrna in the No. 41 for Cook-Finley Racing. He would also run the next two races at Five Flags and the Nashville Fairgrounds.
 After testing for Fast Track Racing in ARCA's preseason test session at Daytona, Stephanie Moyer made her East Series debut with Fast Track at Five Flags in their No. 12 car. On March 9, 2021, Moyer tweeted that she would also drive at the Nashville Fairgrounds in the same car. She would also end up competing in the races at Southern National Motorsports Park and Milwaukee in the No. 12, Iowa in the No. 01, and Bristol in the No. 44 for Ferrier McClure Racing in a partnership with Fast Track.
 On April 8, 2021, Taylor Gray, who was scheduled to run another full season in the East Series, suffered a fractured L4 vertebra, left foot, and ankle in a single-car accident in Statesville, NC. On July 6, David Gilliland Racing announced that he had recovered and would return to complete the remainder of his scheduled starts, beginning with the main ARCA Series race at Elko.
 On May 6, 2021, it was announced that Mason Mingus would drive the No. 11 for Fast Track Racing at the Nashville Fairgrounds Speedway, his home track. This is his first start in the series since 2017. Mingus competed full-time in the main ARCA Series with Win-Tron Racing in 2013, finishing 2nd in the standings, and full-time in the Truck Series in 2014 and 2015 with Win-Tron and later Billy Boat Motorsports. He would also return to the team and drive the same car in the races at SNMP and Bristol.
 On May 10, 2021, Young's Motorsports announced that Connor Mosack, a late model driver for JR Motorsports, would make his stock car debut in their No. 02 at Dover, and would also compete in the combination race at Milwaukee.
 On June 7, 2021, GMS Racing announced that Daniel Dye would join the team in their No. 21 car to compete part-time in the main ARCA Menards Series and would also move over from his full-time ride with Ben Kennedy Racing to GMS to run the rest of the East Series schedule.

Crew chiefs
 On December 9, 2020, it was announced that defending championship-winning crew chief Mardy Lindley would be joining Kyle Busch Motorsports in the Truck Series to crew chief their No. 51. Lindley was previously the crew chief of the GMS Racing No. 21 driven by Sam Mayer, and won back-to-back championships in the series with him in 2019 and 2020. He also won two other East Series championships in 2013 and 2017. This announcement came after it had been announced that Lindley would return to GMS Racing to crew chief their new driver Jack Wood this season.

Manufacturers
 After 10 years with Toyota as their manufacturer, Rev Racing switched back to Chevy in 2021, which was their manufacturer in 2010, the team's first season.
 Visconti Motorsports switched from Chevy to Toyota in 2021.

Schedule
New Smyrna, Five Flags, and Dover revealed their race dates ahead of the release of the entire schedule, which ARCA announced on December 18, 2020.

Note: Races highlighted in gold were combination events with the ARCA Menards Series.

Results and standings

Race results

Drivers' championship

Notes: 
 The pole winner also receives 1 bonus point, similar to the previous ARCA points system used until 2019 and unlike NASCAR.
 Additionally, after groups of 5 races of the season, drivers that compete in all 5 races receive 50 additional points.
 After the fifth race of the season at Southern National Motorsports Park, Sammy Smith, Mason Diaz, Joey Iest, Max Gutiérrez, Daniel Dye, Parker Retzlaff, and Rajah Caruth received this points bonus for having competed in the first 5 races of the season (New Smyrna, Five Flags, Nashville Fairgrounds, Dover, and SNMP).

(key) Bold – Pole position awarded by time. Italics – Pole position set by final practice results or rainout. * – Most laps led. ** – All laps led.

See also
 2021 NASCAR Cup Series
 2021 NASCAR Xfinity Series
 2021 NASCAR Camping World Truck Series
 2021 ARCA Menards Series
 2021 ARCA Menards Series West
 2021 NASCAR Whelen Modified Tour
 2021 NASCAR Pinty's Series
 2021 NASCAR Whelen Euro Series
 2021 eNASCAR iRacing Pro Invitational Series
 2021 SRX Series

References

ARCA Menards Series
ARCA Menards Series East
ARCA Menards Series East